Jarjisa is a village in northwestern Syria, administratively part of the Hama Governorate, southwest of Hama. It is situated on the eastern banks of the Orontes River, the border between the governorates of Hama and Homs. Nearby localities include Tumin to the east, al-Rastan to the southeast, Kafr Nan to the southwest, Hirbnafsah to the west, Deir al-Fardis to the northwest and al-Biyah to the north.

Demographics
According to the Central Bureau of Statistics, Jarjisa had a population of 4,352 in the 2004 census. Its inhabitants are predominantly Turkmen Sunni Muslims and were recorded as Muslims in 1838.

References

Bibliography

 

Populated places in Hama District
Turkmen communities in Syria